Joseph Joubert (6 May 1754 in Montignac, Périgord – 4 May 1824 in Paris) was a French moralist and essayist, remembered today largely for his Pensées (Thoughts), which were published posthumously.

Biography
From the age of fourteen Joubert attended a religious college in Toulouse, where he later taught until 1776. In 1778 he went to Paris where he met D'Alembert and Diderot, amongst others, and later became a friend of a young writer and diplomat, Chateaubriand.

He alternated between living in Paris with his friends and life in the privacy of the countryside in Villeneuve-sur-Yonne. He was appointed inspector-general of universities under Napoleon.

Joubert published nothing during his lifetime, but he wrote a copious number of letters and filled sheets of paper and small notebooks with thoughts about the nature of human existence, literature, and other topics, in a poignant, often aphoristic style. After his death his widow entrusted Chateaubriand with these notes, and in 1838, he published a selection titled, Recueil des pensées de M. Joubert (Collected Thoughts of Mr. Joubert). More complete editions were to follow, as were collections of Joubert's correspondence.

Somewhat of the Epicurean school of philosophy, Joubert even valued his own frequent suffering of ill health, as he believed sickness gave subtlety to the soul.

Joubert's works have been translated into numerous languages. In 1866 "Some of the 'Thoughts' of Joseph Joubert" were translated by George H. Calvert. A later English translation version was made by Paul Auster. 
Matthew Arnold in his Critical Essays devotes a section to Joubert.

Quotes
There are some acts of justice which corrupt those who perform them.

Principal editions
Recueil des pensées de M. Joubert, published by Chateaubriand, Le Normant, Paris, 1838. Text online
Pensées, essais, maximes et correspondance de J. Joubert, preface by Paul Raynal, Le Normant, Paris, 1850 ; 1861. Text on line
Pensées, introduction and noted by Victor Giraud, Bloud, Paris, 1909
Carnets, texts collected by André Beaunier, Gallimard, Paris, 1938 ; 1994
Correspondance de Louis de Fontanes et de Joseph Joubert : (1785-1819), Plon, Paris, 1943
Pensées et Lettres, organized by Raymond Dumay and Maurice Andrieux, Grasset, 1954
Pensées, selected texts presented by Raymond Dumay, Club français du livre, 1954
Essais : 1779-1821, complete critical version by Rémy Tessonneau, A.G. Nizet, Paris, 1983

References

External links

Joubert's works at Bibliothèque nationale de France (in French)
Review of translations by Paul Auster
English translations of Joubert's works at Internet Archive

1754 births
1824 deaths
French male essayists
People from Dordogne